The Sydney–Perth rail corridor is a  railway route that runs for  across Australia from Sydney, New South Wales, to Perth, Western Australia. Most of the route is under the control of the Australian Rail Track Corporation. 

The corridor is heavily trafficked by long-distance freight trains.
, the rail corridor carried 81 per cent of land freight between the eastern states and Perth, up from 60 per cent in 1996–97; and in November 2007, 3.46 billion gross tonne-kilometres of freight was carried, a record at the time.

, major freight operators on the corridor included Pacific National, Aurizon, and SCT Logistics.

The Indian Pacific, an experiential tourism passenger train, operates along the entire route. Its sister train, The Ghan, travels over part of the corridor – from Adelaide to Tarcoola – before it proceeds north to Darwin. Some local passenger services operate at each end (in Western Australia and New South Wales) but not in the central part, in South Australia.

Until the route was converted to standard gauge in 1970, differing choices of track gauges by three state governments required passengers and freight to be trans-shipped at Broken Hill, Port Pirie, and Kalgoorlie. These stations were on the following lines (from east to west):

the New South Wales Government's standard-gauge Sydney–Broken Hill line, opened in 1927
the Silverton Tramway Company's short narrow-gauge line from Broken Hill to Cockburn, opened in 1888
the South Australian Government's narrow-gauge Cockburn–Port Pirie line, completed in 1888
the Australian federal government's standard-gauge Port Pirie–Port Augusta line, opened in 1937, and its contiguous standard-gauge Trans-Australian Railway, opened in 1917 as a major project following Australia's federation
the Western Australian Government's narrow-gauge Eastern Goldfields Railway from Kalgoorlie to Perth, opened in 1897.

Notes

References

Bibliography

Railway lines in South Australia
Railway lines in New South Wales
Railway lines in Western Australia
Standard gauge railways in Australia
Interstate rail in Australia
Railway lines opened in 1970